"No Fue Suficiente" (English: "It Wasn't Enough") is the second single by Mexican singer Paty Cantú from her debut studio album, Me Quedo Sola, released in 2009.

Charts

References

External links
"No Fue Suficiente" music video at YouTube.com

2009 singles
Paty Cantú songs
Spanish-language songs
2009 songs
EMI Records singles
Songs written by Paty Cantú